Tekoa or Tekoah may refer to:

 Tekoa, Washington, a town in the United States
 Tekoa Mountain (Washington), a mountain near the town in Washington State
 Tekoa Mountain, a ridge in the Berkshires of Massachusetts, United States
 Tekoa, Gush Etzion, an Israeli town and settlement in the West Bank
 Tuqu', also known as Tekoa or Teqoa, a biblical site and Palestinian town in the West Bank
 Yosef Tekoah (1925–1991), Israeli diplomat and President of the Ben-Gurion University of the Negev

See also
 Takua language